The Forge is a famous nightclub / restaurant on Arthur Godfrey Road in the city of Miami Beach, Florida.  First opened in the 1920s, it was purchased and remodeled in the late 1960s by Alvin Malnik.  It was a well-known hangout for both celebrities and organized crime figures.

In 1977, Meyer Lansky's stepson, Richard Schwartz, was charged with the murder of his drinking companion, Craig Teriaca, in the bar at The Forge.  The shooting reportedly occurred after the two argued over a $10 bill.  Schwartz was killed a few months later in what police assumed to be a revenge killing. A lawsuit by Teriaca's widow against The Forge, alleging that the restaurant had provided inadequate security, ended in a mistrial in 1980.

A serious fire closed the restaurant for three months in 1991.  The following year, the restaurant's extensive wine collection was severely damaged in Hurricane Andrew; this led to an extended and well-publicized legal battle between the restaurant and its insurers over the value of the collection, eventually settled in 1997 by a $2.75 million payment.

Al Malnik's son Shareef Malnik now owns and controls The Forge; it remains a well-known location for Miami night life.  The restaurant closed in 2009 for a year-long renovation, and reopened in 2010 with a redesigned interior by Francois Frossard.

References

External links
Official website

Restaurants in Miami